WWE: Uncaged III is a compilation album of unreleased professional wrestling entrance theme songs which was released by WWE on August 21, 2017 on online music stores.

Track listing
All songs are composed, written and produced by Jim Johnston

See also

Music in professional wrestling

References

WWE albums
2017 compilation albums